A Nerf war is an activity involving Nerf Blaster or other foam-blasting toys. Nerf wars can be a wide range of combat, from informal shootouts in offices and basements to well-organized outdoor battles with high-powered modified blasters and toys. Since foam-firing blasters are relatively safe and cheap with practice, Nerf wars can include participants and battlefields otherwise unsuitable for airsoft and paintball.

How to play
Nerf wars can take place anywhere; any area with a good balance of open space and cover can be a candidate. Basements, offices, and backyards are common locations for informal wars. For larger wars with more participants, bigger venues like gymnasiums, public parks, forests, ravines, churches, and schools make good battlefields areas. The inside of a large hall such as a room can may be turned into a trap by turning tables onto their sides. When planning a Nerf war in a public area, the organizer typically reserves the space and watches out for non-participants to reduce any liability. The ability to play in free locations is an important element of a Nerf war's accessibility.

Nerf Internet community (NIC) wars
Many wars across the United States are organized and promoted through the forums of enthusiast sites like OZNERF, PDK Films, NerfRevolution, Nerfhaven, NerfHQ, Foam Universe, and Heart of Nerf. The members of these forums are collectively known as the Nerf Internet Community, or NIC. 
 
The NIC holds large annual wars on both the East Coast and West Coast of the United States and certain locations even have bi-annual or monthly wars. All around Australia there are wars as well, and a yearly event called Reign of Foam. Some colleges and youth groups have active clubs and associations that host Nerf wars regularly.

Rules of participation are set by the wars hosts to create a safer and more balanced game. Over time, the NIC has centered on a widely accepted set of standard rules, regulations, and battle types.

See also
Humans vs. Zombies
Team deathmatch

References

Further sources

Sock It to Me: Competitive Knitters Get Deadly Serious; Based on 'Assassin' Game, This Contest Has Players On Pins and Needles. Kevin J. Delaney. Wall Street Journal. (Eastern edition). New York, N.Y.: Dec 17, 2007. pg. A.1

ALL WORK AND SOME PLAY BRINGING JOY TO THE OFFICE; [FINAL Edition] RODD AUBREY THE ASSOCIATED PRESS. Seattle Post - Intelligencer. Seattle, Wash.: Jul 7, 1998. pg. C.2
Title:Nerf Guns Strike a Nerve on Campuses. (cover story) Authors:Young, Jeffrey R. Source:Chronicle of Higher Education; 4/25/2008, Vol. 54 Issue 33, pA1-A8, 2p

Outdoor games
Outdoor recreation